The 101st Illinois Infantry Regiment was an infantry regiment that served in the Union Army during the American Civil War.

Service 
The 101st  Illinois Infantry was organized at Jacksonville, Illinois, and mustered into Federal service on September 2, 1862. The regiment was mustered out on June 7, 1865, and discharged at Springfield, Illinois, on June 21, 1865.

Total strength and casualties 
The regiment suffered 3 officers and 47 enlisted men who were killed in action or who died of their wounds and 1 officer and 118 enlisted men who died of disease, for a total of 169 fatalities.

Commanders 
Colonel Charles H. Fox – Resigned May 1, 1864.
Lieutenant Colonel John B. Lesage – Mustered out with the regiment.

Notable regiment members 
 Major Napoleon Bonaparte Brown

See also 
List of Illinois Civil War Units
Illinois in the American Civil War

References

Bibliography 
 Dyer, Frederick H. (1959). A Compendium of the War of the Rebellion.  Sagamore Press, Inc. Thomas Yoseloff. 

Units and formations of the Union Army from Illinois
Military units and formations established in 1862
Military units and formations disestablished in 1865
1862 establishments in Illinois